Abraham Burickson (born 1975 New York City, New York) is an American poet and conceptual artist.

Life
Son of Sherwin Burickson, Abraham Burickson attended Cornell University, receiving a BA in architecture. In 2002 he moved to San Francisco where with actor Matthew Purdon he founded the conceptual art and performance group Odyssey Works. In 2008 Burickson received an MFA from The University of Texas Michener Center for Writers. His book, co-authored by Ayden LeRoux and published by Princeton Architectural Press in 2016, Odyssey Works: Transformative Experiences for an Audience of One outlines an approach to art-making as experience design. He was the Risley Artist-in-Residence at Cornell University in 2010, and has taught at Maryland Institute College of Art and Academy of Art University.

Awards
 2010: Artist-In-Residence at Cornell University's Risley Residential College
 2005-2008: James Michener Fellow in Poetry at The University of Texas Michener Center for Writers
 2005: Fellowship, Millay Colony for the Arts

Chapbooks
Charlie. Codhill Press, 2010.

Anthologies
 Best New Poets 2008. Ed. Mark Strand. University of Virginia Press, 2008.

References

External links
New York Times Review of Odyssey Works 2012
Codhill Press Biography
A poem Returning, Blackbird, 2008
Another poem
Another poem

1975 births
21st-century American poets
American conceptual artists
Cornell University College of Architecture, Art, and Planning alumni
Living people
Academy of Art University faculty
Michener Center for Writers alumni